Lake Kastraki is an artificial lake near Kastraki in Aetolia-Acarnania, western Greece. The lake is drained by the river Acheloos, and fed by the rivers Acheloos and Inachos. It was formed by the Kastraki Dam, completed in 1969. Its area is about 28 km² and its maximum capacity is 950,000,000 m³ of water. It is used for the generation of hydroelectric power by DEI.

Gallery

References

External links
 Kastraki Dam
 thecivilengineer.org
 hydroplus.com

Reservoirs in Greece
Landforms of Aetolia-Acarnania
Landforms of Western Greece